CenturyTel of Claiborne, Inc. is a telephone operating company of CenturyLink providing local telephone services to communities in Tennessee, including New Tazewell and Sharps Chapel. The company was founded in 1960.

The company was named Century Telephone of Claiborne, Inc. until 1998

The company is owned by CenturyLink, which used to be CenturyTel.

References

Lumen Technologies
Communications in Tennessee
1960 establishments in Tennessee
Telecommunications companies established in 1960
Telecommunications companies of the United States
American companies established in 1960